Joannis Karsanidis (born 25 June 1993), also spelt Ioannis, is German former footballer of Greek descent who played as a midfielder.

Club career
On 30 May 2016, Karsanidis extended his contract with Würzburger Kickers until 2018.

International career
Karsanidis was born in Germany and is of Greek descent, and says he would prefer to play for Greece national football team.

Honours
Würzburger Kickers
Winner
 Bavarian Cup (2): 2013–14, 2015–16

References

External links
 

1993 births
Footballers from Nuremberg
Citizens of Greece through descent
German people of Greek descent
Sportspeople of Greek descent
Living people
German footballers
Greek footballers
Association football midfielders
Würzburger Kickers players
Chemnitzer FC players
2. Bundesliga players
3. Liga players
Regionalliga players